Thury may refer to:

People
Pierre de Thury ( -1410), said the cardinal Maillezais, a French cardinal of the Avignon Obedience, see Council of Pisa
György Thury (1519-1571), a Hungarian nobleman (hu)
Louis-Pierre Thury (died in 1699), French missionary priest in Acadia
César-François Cassini de Thury (1714-1784), French geographer
Louis-Étienne Héricart de Thury (1776–1854), French scientist and politician
René Thury (1860-1938), a Swiss engineer

Toponyms

France

Thury, Côte-d'Or, in the Côte-d'Or (département)
Thury, Yonne, in the Yonne (département)
Thury-en-Valois, in the Oise (département)
Thury-Harcourt, in the Calvados (département)
Thury-sous-Clermont, in the Oise (département)
La Villeneuve-sous-Thury, French commune in the Oise (département)

Engineering
Abbreviation for Thury-System, an outdated mechanical HVDC-system developed by René Thury